Ron Morgan (born May 25, 1951) is a Canadian former professional ice hockey player.

During the 1973–74 season, Morgan played four games in the World Hockey Association with the Cleveland Crusaders.

References

External links

1951 births
Living people
Canadian ice hockey left wingers
Cleveland Crusaders players
Hampton Gulls (SHL) players
Jacksonville Barons players
Macon Whoopees (SHL) players
Mohawk Valley Comets players
Syracuse Blazers players
Syracuse Eagles players
Ice hockey people from Toronto